Julio Pablo Chacón (born May 22, 1975) is an Argentine boxer. Nicknamed "El Relámpago", Chacon won a Featherweight Bronze medal at the 1996 Summer Olympics. He was born in Las Heras, Mendoza.

Amateur highlights

1994 competed as a Bantamweight at the World Cup in Bangkok, Thailand.
Lost to Steve Naraina (Mauritius) PTS
1996 won the Featherweight bronze medal at the Atlanta Olympics.
Defeated Tyson Gray (Jamaica) PTS (6-5)
Defeated Josian Lebon (Mauritius) PTS (14-7)
Defeated János Nagy (Hungary) PTS (18-4)
Lost to Somluck Kamsing (Thailand) PTS (8-20)

Professional career

Chacon began his professional career in 1996 and went on to become WBO Featherweight champion.  Chacon won his first 36 fights, setting up a fight with WBA Featherweight Title holder Freddie Norwood in 2000.  Norwood dropped Chacon in the 3rd and won a unanimous decision. In 2001, Chacon would get a second shot at a world title. On this occasion Chacon defeated Istvan Kovacs by TKO to win the WBO Featherweight title. He defended his title twice, including a victory over Colombian contender Victor Polo. Chacon would eventually lose the title in 2002 to interim champ Scott Harrison via unanimous decision. He later moved up a weight class and challenged American cotender Mike Anchondo for the Vacant WBO Super Featherweight Title, Chacon lost via unanimous decision. In 2010 he won the Konex Award Merit Diploma as one of the five best boxers of the last decade in Argentina.

Professional boxing record

See also
List of world featherweight boxing champions

References

External links

 

1975 births
Living people
Argentine male boxers
Sportspeople from Mendoza Province
Boxers at the 1995 Pan American Games
Pan American Games competitors for Argentina
Boxers at the 1996 Summer Olympics
Olympic boxers of Argentina
Olympic bronze medalists for Argentina
Olympic medalists in boxing
Medalists at the 1996 Summer Olympics
Super-featherweight boxers
World featherweight boxing champions
World Boxing Organization champions